The Russian Volleyball Super League 2007/2008 was the 17th official season of Russian Volleyball Super League. In all there are 12 teams.
Dynamo won second title

Teams

Regular season

Standings

Results

Playoffs 
23, 24, 28, 29 April and 3 May

Places 1/2

Dynamo Moscow 3 : 1 Iskra

Places 3/4

Dynamo Tattransgaz 3 : 1 Lokomotiv Novosibirsk

Places 5/6

Lokomotiv Belogorie  3 : 1 Ural

External links 
 Volleyball in Russia season 07-08

Russian Volleyball Super League
2007 in volleyball
2008 in volleyball
2007 in Russian sport
2008 in Russian sport